Gerronema stevensonii is a species of agaric fungus in the family Marasmiaceae. It was first described by Miles Joseph Berkeley and Christopher Edmund Broome in 1875, calling it Cantharellus stevensonii. The fungus was named after Reverend John Stevenson, who in 1874 made the type collection in Glamis, Scotland. Roy Watling transferred the species to the genus Gerronema in 1998.

References

Marasmiaceae
Fungi described in 1875
Fungi of Europe
Taxa named by Miles Joseph Berkeley
Taxa named by Christopher Edmund Broome